Khatak Chincholi  is a village in the southern state of Karnataka, India. It is located in the Bhalki taluk of Bidar district in Karnataka. A famous 12th century Historical temple located in the village is Hulakunti Math the main god is Shree Shantalingeshwara.

The Hulakunti Jatra (village festival) happens every year of Shravan Masa(July- August Month)  middle Monday where Karnataka, Andhra  and Maharashtra devotees participate for the famous festival.
Other places of worship include the Shree veermahanteshwar math and Shree Kottrappa swamy Parwathmath temple.

Demographics
 India census, Khatak Chincholi had a population of 15779 with 8755 males and 7024 females.

See also
 Bidar
 Districts of Karnataka

References

External links
 http://Bidar.nic.in/

Villages in Bidar district